The Dilmaghani family, the oldest existing manufacturers of hand knotted carpets and oriental rugs, can be traced back to the 1850s Qajar dynasty, Persia.  In an industry which largely produces untitled items often identifiable only by experts, the history and lineage of any name relating to specific types of rugs for so many decades is unusual.  Through the 1960s, the Dilmaghani family was still designing, manufacturing and importing Persian carpets from Iran to the United States.  Dilmaghani is seen as an important connection of 19th and 20th century Persian rug and carpet production in and around the cities of Tabriz and Kermān.  Dilmaghani remains among the best known names of branded 19th, 20th and 21st century hand knotted carpets.

Identification 

Often, carpets by Dilmaghani from the mid 19th century through the early first quarter of the 20th are identifiable by a large woven signature (in Persian).  They are usually within the border of Kermān Persian rugs bearing cartouche inscriptions loosely translate as: "Made to Order by Dilmaghani." Additionally, some rugs had numerical Persian inscriptions.  The two earliest generations of Dilmaghani carpets are identified by these Persian numerical designations.  The earliest number, '02', spans ca. 1845-1880.  The second generation of signed rugs, designated with a '92', spans ca. 1880-1910.

Post first quarter 20th century examples are either modestly signed, or bear the firm's trademark Crown with laurel, known as the Cyrus Crown.  Mid-century unauthorized replicas of the firm's Crown Kerman carpets are often referred to as "Imperial Crown" or "Crown Royal" Kermans.  These and other permutations using the word "Crown" were created by other manufacturers to ride on the clout of true Cyrus Crown Carpets  as well as the Dilmaghani firm.

History 

The Dilmaghani family were of Azerbaijani origin, and were largely wholesale general merchants, or tujjar (Khan al-Tujjar), as well as sarraf, or bankers. The first account of the Dilmaghani family that relates to carpet manufacturing and trade traces from the 1850s; first in Tabriz and later in Kermān. The Dilmaghanis were also involved in the export of dried fruit to Russia and Turkey working through agents throughout Persia and representatives in Constantinople.

The oldest documented and verifiable producer of Dilmaghani branded carpets is Hadji Mohammed Hussein Dilmaghani, whose primary business were selling bills of credit to India and manufacturing fine Persian carpets. Early carpets by Dilmaghani are often identified through auction houses such as Sotheby's, Christie's and Skinner, Inc. and knowledgeable authorities in antique rugs made in workshops or cities.

Mehdi Dilmaghani, Hadji Mohammad's son, arrived in the United States in 1922 and founded Mehdi Dilmaghani & Co. Inc. in Manhattan New York. Mehdi Dilmaghani continued to manufacture, import and distribute Persian rugs for the American and European markets and therefore is regarded as a significant tie between 19th and 20th century carpet production.

In 1963, Mehdi Dilmaghani and Co. Inc relocated from Manhattan to Scarsdale, New York.  The Dilmaghani firm contracted architect Robert Carroll May, a long-time understudy & apprentice of Frank Lloyd Wright to carry out Dilmaghani's building design.  The Dilmaghani showroom contains 20,000 square feet of showroom, office and warehouse space free of internal support pillars and load-bearing walls.

Today, 4th and 5th generation Dilmaghanis continue, and are active, in the Oriental Rug industry. Dennis Dilmaghani, Mehdi Dilmaghani's son, became president and took over operation of the company in 1977. David Dilmaghani (5th generation) operates his own business with focus on antique and vintage hand knotted rugs in retail capacity both online (national and international) and locally with a retail presence.

Persian rugs 

Dilmaghani Persian rug production into the 1880s was supervised by Hadji Mohammed Hussein's brother, Hadji Mohammad Dilmaghani.  In 1911, more than 2,000 weavers in Kerman City were under contract to Hadji Mohammad Dilmaghani.  Their primary market was in America, and by 1917 the market value of a single export shipment to Europe or America could reach as high as $24,000.

From the early 1920s through the early 1960s, Dilmaghani owned three factories in Kerman, and several in Tabriz and Sarouk, Persia.  Based on quality, these carpets were subjected to the highest import tax assessment determined by United States Customs.  In 1929, Dilmaghani adapted a crown and laurel woven into specific rugs to supplement or substitute the long-time run of Dilmaghani signatures.  Mehdi Dilmaghani & Co. Inc. registered several variations of their Cyrus Crown trademark in 1934.  Post mid 20th century, Dilmaghani still traded and imported Kerman carpets, and the Cyrus Crown trademark remains active and in use today.  Over the course of nearly sixty years, Mehdi manufactured an estimated 25,000 Crown Kerman, Crown Sarouks and Crown Tabriz Carpets ranging from 2'x3' to 15' x 30' in size.  Crown carpets were extensively documented, and the firm still retains many original production records including weaver names and loom dates for carpets from the 1930s.

Oriental rugs 

Since the early 1950s, Dilmaghani manufactured and imported oriental rugs from many countries other than Iran including carpets made in Afghanistan, Armenia, Bulgaria, China, Hungary, India, Japan, Nepal, Pakistan, Portugal, Romania, Russia, Spain, Tibet and Turkey.

An installation of a Dilmaghani carpet was made in the Reading Room of the Clinton School of Public Service located on the William J. Clinton Presidential Center Campus, Little Rock Arkansas 2004 which took several years to make.

Notable products 

Cyrus Crown Carpets
  This is the company's flagship brand

Adnan Collection
  A Dilmaghani Cyrus Crown edition carpet.  This carpet was chosen for, and may be seen installed in the Reading Room of the Clinton School of Public Service on the campus of the William J. Clinton Presidential Center, Little Rock Arkansas.

References

External links 

Carpet manufacturing companies
Companies based in Westchester County, New York
Buildings and structures in Westchester County, New York
Design companies established in 1922
Manufacturing companies established in 1922
1922 establishments in New York City
Textile companies of Iran